The National Committee of the Chinese Defense Industry, Postal and Telecommunications Workers’ Union is a national industrial union of the All-China Federation of Trade Unions in the People's Republic of China.

External links
basic info from the ACFTU

National industrial unions (China)
Postal trade unions
Defence and munitions trade unions